The Mount Nothofagus National Park is a protected national park located in the Northern Rivers region of New South Wales, Australia.

The average elevation of the terrain is 746 meters above sea level.

The park is part of the Focal Peak Group World Heritage Site Gondwana Rainforests of Australia inscribed in 1986 and added to the Australian National Heritage List in 2007.

The park is also part of the Scenic Rim Important Bird Area, identified as such by BirdLife International because of its importance in the conservation of several species of threatened birds.

In November 2019 about three quarters of the park were burnt in a bushfire, during a period of drought that was so severe that most of the rainforest gullies, which are usually moist enough to act as buffers to fire, were destroyed.

See also

 Protected areas of New South Wales
 High Conservation Value Old Growth forest

References

National parks of New South Wales
Protected areas established in 1999
Gondwana Rainforests of Australia
1999 establishments in Australia
Important Bird Areas of New South Wales
Northern Rivers